BR-383 is a Brazilian federal highway that begins in Conselheiro Lafaiete, Minas Gerais and ends in Ubatuba, in the state of São Paulo. The highway also serves the municipalities of São João del Rei and Itajubá in Minas Gerais and Campos do Jordão and Taubaté in São Paulo.

References

Federal highways in Brazil